Andrzej Zdzisław Wrona (born 27 December 1988) is a Polish professional volleyball player, a former member of the Polish national team, and the 2014 World Champion. At the professional club level, he plays for Projekt Warsaw.

Career

Clubs
He debuted in PlusLiga in the 2007/2008 season, when he played for Wkręt-Met Domex AZS Częstochowa. With this club, he won a silver medal at the Polish Championship and Polish Cup in 2007/2008. In the next three seasons, he played for Delecta Bydgoszcz, where he was the primary player. His high level of play was the reason that he moved to one of the top Polish clubs, PGE Skra Bełchatów in 2013. He won a title of Polish Champion 2014 with PGE Skra Bełchatów. On October 8, 2014 his team won Polish SuperCup. On May 6, 2015 he won with PGE Skra Bełchatów bronze medal of Polish Championship. In May 2015 he extended the contract with PGE Skra Bełchatów until the end of the season 2016/2017. On February 7, 2016 he played with PGE Skra and won the 2016 Polish Cup after beating ZAKSA in the final. In April 2016 he was a member of the same team which won a bronze medal in the 2015–16 PlusLiga championship.

National team
He was first appointed to the Polish national team by Andrea Anastasi in 2012. He debuted in a Poland – Serbia friendly match. He played in the Polish national team at World League 2013. On September 21, 2014 won a title of World Champion 2014. On October 27, 2014 received a state award granted by the Polish President Bronisław Komorowski – Gold Cross of Merit for outstanding sports achievements and worldwide promotion of Poland.

Honours

Clubs
 National championships
 2007/2008  Polish Cup, with AZS Częstochowa
 2013/2014  Polish Championship, with PGE Skra Bełchatów
 2014/2015  Polish SuperCup, with PGE Skra Bełchatów
 2015/2016  Polish Cup, with PGE Skra Bełchatów

Individual awards
 2019: Polish Championship – Best Blocker

State awards
 2014:  Gold Cross of Merit

References

External links

 
 Player profile at PlusLiga.pl 
 Player profile at Volleybox.net

1988 births
Living people
Volleyball players from Warsaw
Polish men's volleyball players
Polish Champions of men's volleyball
Recipients of the Gold Cross of Merit (Poland)
AZS Częstochowa players
BKS Visła Bydgoszcz players
Skra Bełchatów players
Projekt Warsaw players
Middle blockers